Polyommatus afghanistana is a butterfly of the family Lycaenidae. It was described by Walter Forster in 1972. It is found in Afghanistan.

References

Butterflies described in 1972
Polyommatus
Butterflies of Asia